Syabda Perkasa Belawa (25 August 2001 – 20 March 2023) was an Indonesian badminton player affiliated with PB Djarum badminton club from 2013 to 2023, and joined Indonesia national badminton team training center in 2018.

Career

2022 
In June, Belawa won the Lithuanian International after beating fellow Indonesian player Alwi Farhan. In November, Belawa won the Malaysia International after beating Chinese player Lei Lanxi.

2023 
Belawa opened the 2023 season at Iran Fajr International. He won the title after defeating Malaysian player Justin Hoh.

Death 
Belawa died in a traffic accident on 20 March 2023 at the Pemalang-Batang Toll Road while travelling to Sragen with his parents and siblings in the early hours for funeral of his late grand mother. His mother was also killed, while his siblings survived. His father is in a critical condition.

Achievements

BWF International Challenge/Series (3 titles) 
Men's singles

  BWF International Challenge tournament
  BWF International Series tournament
  BWF Future Series tournament

BWF Junior International (1 title) 

Boys' singles

  BWF Junior International Grand Prix tournament
  BWF Junior International Challenge tournament
  BWF Junior International Series tournament
  BWF Junior Future Series tournament

Performance timeline

National team 
 Junior level

 Senior level

Individual competitions 
 Junior level

 Senior level

References 

2001 births
2023 deaths
Sportspeople from Jakarta
Indonesian male badminton players
Road incident deaths in Indonesia